Uruca is the seventh district of the San José canton, in the San José province of Costa Rica. It is an important industrial and commercial area of San José. Commonly known as La Uruca, it's the second biggest district by area (after Pavas), and recognized as a heavily congested transportation hub.

Geography 
Uruca has an area of  km² and an elevation of  metres.

It is the capital's western entrance. The canton's whole boundary with Heredia Province is confined in this district: Belén, Heredia and Santo Domingo cantons limit with La Uruca on its northern side, as well as San José's Escazú and Tibás. Merced, Mata Redonda and Pavas also border the district.

Locations 
Uruca district includes the "barrios" (or neighbourhoods) of Alborada, Bajos de Torres, Carpio, Carranza, Corazón de Jesús, Cristal, Finca de la Caja, Florentino Castro, Jardines de Autopi, Las Animas, Magnolias, Marimil, Monserrat, Peregrina, Robledal, Rositer Carballo, Santander, Saturno, Uruca Centro, Vuelta del Virilla and Zona Industrial.

Demographics 

For the 2011 census, Uruca had a population of  inhabitants.

Transportation

Road transportation 
The district is covered by the following road routes:
 National Route 1
 National Route 3
 National Route 39
 National Route 100
 National Route 101
 National Route 108

Rail transportation 
The Interurbano Line operated by Incofer goes through this district.

External links 
Municipalidad de San José. Distrito Uruca – Website of San Jose Mayor, includes a map of the district and related info.

References 

Districts of San José Province
Populated places in San José Province